The 2014–15 Nemzeti Bajnokság I is the 63rd season of the Nemzeti Bajnokság I, Hungary's premier Handball league.

Team information 

The following 12 clubs compete in the NB I during the 2014–15 season:

Personnel and kits
Following is the list of clubs competing in 2014–15 Nemzeti Bajnokság I, with their president, head coach, kit manufacturer and shirt sponsor.

Regular season

Standings

Pld - Played; W - Won; D - Drawn; L - Lost; GF - Goals for; GA - Goals against; Diff - Difference; Pts - Points.

Schedule and results
In the table below the home teams are listed on the left and the away teams along the top.

Championship round

Standings

Pld - Played; W - Won; D - Drawn; L - Lost; GF - Goals for; GA - Goals against; Diff - Difference; Pts - Points.

Schedule and results
In the table below the home teams are listed on the left and the away teams along the top.

Final
1st placed team hosted Games 1 and, plus Game 3 if necessary. 2nd placed team hosted Game 2.

1st leg

2nd leg

''MKB-MVM Veszprém won Championship final series 2–0.

Third place
3rd placed team hosted Games 1 and, plus Game 3 if necessary. 4th placed team hosted Game 2.

Relegation round

Standings

Pld - Played; W - Won; D - Drawn; L - Lost; GF - Goals for; GA - Goals against; Diff - Difference; Pts - Points.

Schedule and results
In the table below the home teams are listed on the left and the away teams along the top.

Season statistics

Top goalscorers
Updated to games played on 24 May 2015.

Source:

Number of teams by counties

NB I clubs in 2014–15 European competitions

 MKB-MVM Veszprém

 MOL-Pick Szeged

 Balatonfüredi KSE

 Grundfos-Tatabánya KC

 Orosházi FKSE-LINAMAR

References

External links
 Hungarian Handball Federaration 

Nemzeti Bajnokság I (men's handball)
2014–15 domestic handball leagues
Nemzeti Bajnoksag I Men